Wadi Al Maawil is a Wilayat of Al Batinah South in the Sultanate of Oman.

References 

Populated places in Oman